Vermilyea is a surname of French origin.

People  
 Kristen Vermilyea (born 1969), American actress

Jamie Vermilyea (born 1982), American baseball player

Places 
Vermilyea Lake, lake in Manitoba, Canada

Fictional Characters 
Adam Vermilyea, a fictional character in the anime Gundam SEED DESTINY